is a Japanese anime series produced by Tatsunoko Productions and Sotsu Agency. The series originally aired in Japan on TV Tokyo from February 1, 1990, to February 12, 1991, for a total of 54 episodes. Saban picked up the North American rights to the series in 1991, and produced an English version called Samurai Pizza Cats. The creators stated that there was going to be a spin-off series, . The series is known for its cultural humor consisting of Japanese puns, pop culture, and fourth-wall breaking.

Plot

The series is set in Edoropolis (a portmanteau of "Edo" and "metropolis"), a mechanical city that fuses feudal Japanese culture with contemporary culture populated by cybernetic anthropomorphic "animaloids" (or animal androids). The city is notionally led by shōgun Iei-Iei Tokugawa, but as he is a doddering eccentric, the actual leadership is in the hands of his neurotic daughter Tokugawa Usako and a council. The council is headed by the ambitious prime minister Kitsunezuka Koon-no-Kami, a fox who constantly plots to overthrow the Shogun with the help of his trusted advisor Karasu Gennari-sai, and Karamaru, the leader of an army of ninja crows.

Unknown to the prime minister, council member Inuyama Wanko-no-Kami, the commander of the Palace Guard, learns of his designs on leadership, but is unable to prosecute him for treason because of his plausible deniability. Instead, Inuyama enlists the services of Yattarou, Pururun and Sukashii, cat ninja who work in the city's pizzeria, with their operator Otama. Known collectively as the Nyankī (a play on the Japanese word for a cat's meow and the term "Yankee"), they are assigned to stop Koon-no-Kami and his evil henchmen's plans to take over Edoropolis.

Characters

English dub
When Saban licensed the English version, Samurai Pizza Cats, proper translations of and information about the original Japanese episodes were either of poor quality or non-existent. It was decided to write completely original dialogue for the English dub, playing the show as a wacky, Animaniacs-esque comedy in contrast to the less farcical original. Every episode excluding the two clip shows was dubbed into English. Some episodes of the dubbed version were never aired on United States television due to risque humor (at the time) and depictions of homosexuality.

Merchandise

Video game
In 1991, Tecmo (now known as Koei Tecmo) published a video game based on the anime for the Family Computer. It was officially released in Japan only but was bootlegged outside Japan as Ninja Cat. Although the game was never officially released in the West, complete English adaptation (characters and places names changed to corresponding ones from Samurai Pizza Cats) are available via a fan-made ROM patch. A standalone handheld LSI game (similar to Nintendo's Game&Watch) was also made.

Players take the role of the three main cats and Otasuke members, who can be switched to at any time and have special abilities to progress through the game. The game features most of the characters in the series as well as an additional villain, a mysterious scientist named Dr. Purple (Dr. パープ) who shows up later on in the game and appears to ally with Koon-no-Kami.

The main characters were intended at one point to appear in the Wii fighting game Tatsunoko vs. Capcom: Ultimate All-Stars. The game's producer, Ryota Niitsuma, was quoted in an interview as saying: "One of the main anime we got more requests for than any others was Samurai Pizza Cats... I wanted to see that, but we couldn't reach an agreement."

Soundtrack

A soundtrack CD titled  was released on September 21, 1990.

A second soundtrack CD,  was released on December 21, 1990.

Music
The incidental music was composed by Kenji Kawai (Ghost in the Shell, Patlabor, Ranma ½, Fate/Stay Night, Mobile Suit Gundam 00). The opening and ending ("To Be Yourself") songs were composed by Etsuko Yamakawa, Takeshi Ike and Anju Mana and sung by Reina Yazawa and Ai Orikasa. Ami Itabashi, the singer of the ending song of the Macross OVAs, sang the insert songs.

Home video release
Some episodes were released on video in Japan, but a complete release of the show was held up for many years owing to poor sales. It was rumored that the lack of a DVD release was due to the original masters of some episodes being lost, but this proved not to be the case. Starchild Records released the complete series on DVD in Japan on August 8, 2012, as part of a commemoration of the 50th anniversary of Tatsunoko Pro. The limited edition set sold well, placing second in the national animation DVD sales charts the week of its release.

In North America, Discotek Media announced on March 12, 2012, that they had licensed the home video rights to the series with plans to release both the original Japanese version with English subtitles and Saban's English dub in separate box sets for each version. The Japanese language box set was released on April 30, 2013, while the English dubbed version was released on July 30, 2013.

On May 16, 2016, anime streaming service Crunchyroll began streaming the show under license from Discotek with improved quality subtitles for at least six episodes while the rest used the DVD footage. As of May 23, 2016, all 54 episodes are available for free users.

Toys
Toys and model kits were released in Japan and Europe by Bandai, the latter usually being reboxed versions of the prior. Action figures were made for the Nyanki and the Otasuke (the Japanese originals came as model kits while the European figures came pre-assembled). There were large and small (Gachapon-sized), rubber-like figures, as well as playsets for the smaller figures, including the Nyago King and the pizza parlor.

Manga
A tie-in manga by Yoshimi Hamada was serialized in Comic Bom Bom in 1990. A sequel manga that took place after the end of the television series was released in 1994. The manga was made by Tatsuya Souma.

Other appearances 
 In the 4th episode of the Tatsunoko magical girl parody anime Nurse Witch Komugi-chan R, Komugi Nakahara is at a ninja-themed festival taking a picture of her family behind a standee of the Nyankee. Komugi shouts "Himitsu Ninja Tai" and her family responds "Nyankee".

See also
Samurai Pizza Cats

References

External links
Official Starchild Records website 
Official Sotsu Agency website 
Official Tatsunoko website 

1990 anime television series debuts
1990s Japanese television series
1990 Japanese television series debuts
1990 soundtrack albums
1991 Japanese television series endings
1991 video games
Japanese children's animated action television series
Japanese children's animated comic science fiction television series
Japanese children's animated science fantasy television series
Anime with original screenplays
Discotek Media
Japan-exclusive video games
Nintendo Entertainment System games
Nintendo Entertainment System-only games
Platform games
Tatsunoko Production
Tecmo games
TV Tokyo original programming
Video games developed in Japan
Video games featuring female protagonists